Asker Hundred, or Askers härad, was one of the old subdivisions of Sweden's provinces, also known as the Hundreds of Sweden. It was divided between Närke province and Södermanland province.
Hundreds of Närke
Subdivisions of Sweden